Darren Kissy Yapi (born November 19, 2004) is an American professional soccer player who plays as a forward for Major League Soccer club Colorado Rapids.

Club career
Yapi joined the Colorado Rapids academy in 2016. On July 31, 2020, Yapi moved to USL Championship side Colorado Springs Switchbacks on loan from the Rapids academy.

On March 3, 2021, Yapi signed with Colorado as a homegrown player.

International career
In February 2020, Yapi represented the United States national under-17 team at the UEFA Development Tournament.

Career statistics

Club

References

External links

Profile at US Development Academy

2004 births
Living people
American soccer players
Colorado Rapids players
Colorado Rapids 2 players
Colorado Springs Switchbacks FC players
Association football forwards
Homegrown Players (MLS)
Major League Soccer players
MLS Next Pro players
Soccer players from Denver
United States men's youth international soccer players
USL Championship players